Beymen is a chain of luxury department stores in Istanbul, Turkey with its flagship store in the Nişantaşı district. It has branch department stores in Istanbul in the Akasya, Aqua Florya, Ataköy Plus, İstinye Park, and Zorlu Center malls, as well as two stores along Bağdat Avenue on the Asian side of Istanbul.

Beymen also operates stores in Adana (01 Burda mall), Ankara (Armada, Kavaklıdere, Panora malls), Antalya (Şirinyalı, Rixos malls), Bursa (Korupark), Gaziantep (Sanko Park), Izmir (Hilltown, İstinye Park İzmir), Mersin and Bodrum (Muğla, at Mandarin and the Yalıkavak Marina).

Fodor's compared the chain to Bloomingdale's in the United States. 

As of mid-2022 Beymen Group operates a total of 91,000m2 of retail space across a total of 244 department and specialty stores.

References

Department stores of Turkey